Sai Prasad Corporation Ltd . (SPCL), is an Indian real estate developer headquartered in Pune. It is engaged in the business of construction, energy, food, media, townships, housing projects, commercial premises and other related activities. The company is also engaged in processed foods, agro-products and farms, finance, media, infrastructure, energy and property projects. It is primarily focused on residential and contractual projects.

Sai Prasad Group has 180 branches in 150 cities and over 2000 employees. In 2013, SPCL MD, Shashank Bhapkar was presented with the Young Entrepreneur of the Year Award, by the Indo-British Business Forum, in London. Ram Oberoie the Marketing expert of the company was also presented the same award as being part of Sai Prasad.

Investigations
In 2011, the Ministry of Corporate Affairs began investigating Sai Prasad Group for "alleged financial irregularities", according to Business Standard. In 2013, the investigation extended to the Securities and Exchange Board of India (SEBI), the Reserve Bank of India, and the economic offenses department of the police department in Goa. The company is alleged to have raised money for various businesses in an unauthorized manner. In July 2013, the SEBI ordered Sai Prasad Group to stop collecting money from the public, start any new business projects, or get rid of any assets. The company also charged Ram Oberoie and family with pocketing public funds worth 3550  crores. Sebi orders attachment of bank, demat a/cs of Sai Prasad Corp.

In October 2019, SEBI announced to auction around 200 properties of the group and three of its directories next month so as to recover funds worth thousands of crores raised by the group via illicit collective investment schemes.

References

Real estate companies of India
Companies based in Pune